In cooking, a glaze is a glossy, translucent coating applied to the outer surface of a dish by dipping, dripping, or using a brush. Depending on its nature and intended effect, a glaze may be applied before or after cooking. It may be either sweet or savory (in pâtisserie, the former is known as glaçage); typical glazes include brushed egg whites, some types of icing, and jam (as in nappage), and may or may not include butter, sugar, milk, oil, and fruit or fruit juice.

Examples

Doughnut glaze is made from a simple mixture of confectioner's sugar and water, which is then poured over the doughnuts. Some pastries have a coating of egg whites brushed-on. Some pastries use a "mirror glaze", which is glossy enough to create reflections, and some candies and confections are coated in edible wax glazes, often during tumbling.

A savory glaze such as demi-glace can be made from reduced stock or meat glaze that is poured onto meat or vegetables. A glazed ham may have its glaze applied before baking, basted with it during, or produced after, as with a brown sugar mix being heated by a torch.

History

The origin of glaze recipes can be traced to the medieval British period. A typical medieval English glaze was the 'Elizabethan' glaze made from lightly beaten egg white and sugar used predominantly on pastries of the time.

See also
 General terms:
 Glazing agent
 Icing
 Pastry brush
 In baking and confectionery:
 Couverture chocolate
 Enrobing
 Marron glacé
 In cooking:
 Demi-glace
 Meat glaze

References

Confectionery
Cooking techniques
Culinary terminology